The following is a List of Australian motor racing titles.

See also

Motorsport in Australia

References

 
Australia